Pan Am Flight 6 (registration N90943, and sometimes erroneously called Flight 943) was a round-the-world airline flight that ditched in the Pacific Ocean on October 16, 1956, after two of its four engines failed. Flight 6 left Philadelphia on October 12 as a DC-6B and flew eastward to Europe and Asia on a multi-stop trip. On the evening of October 15 the flight left Honolulu on a Boeing 377 Stratocruiser Clipper named Sovereign Of The Skies (Pan Am fleet number 943, registered N90943). The accident was the basis for the 1958 film Crash Landing.

Accident details
The aircraft took off from Honolulu, Territory of Hawaii, at 8:26 p.m. HST on the flight's last leg to San Francisco. When that altitude was reached, at about 1:20 a.m., the No. 1 engine began to overspeed as power was reduced. The first officer, George Haaker, who was flying the plane, immediately slowed the plane by further reducing power and by extending the flaps, and an attempt was made to feather the propeller. The propeller would not feather and the engine continued to turn at excessive RPM. Captain Richard Ogg decided to cut off the oil supply to the engine. Eventually, the RPM declined and the engine seized. There was a violent thud as the drive shaft broke and the propeller continued to windmill in the air stream, causing drag that increased the fuel consumption.
Climb power was set on the remaining three engines to slow the rate of descent. 

In the 1950s and 1960s the United States Coast Guard maintained a cutter at Ocean Station November midway between Hawaii and the California coast. This ship was able to provide weather information and passed on radio messages to aircraft in the vicinity. On that night, the ship was the 255-foot USCGC Pontchartrain.
The Pontchartrain was contacted and gave Flight 6 a ditching heading determined by weather and sea conditions in case they were required to ditch. 

The No. 4 engine subsequently began to fail and soon was producing only partial power at full throttle. At 2:45 a.m. the No. 4 engine began to backfire, forcing the crew to shut it down and feather the propeller. The flaps were retracted, power on engines 2 and 3 increased to maximum except takeoff (METO). Captain Ogg was faced with an airplane which could not fly above 142 knots without an alarming increase in the number one propeller speed or below 137 knots without encountering stall warning buffet. The Stratocruiser was descending due to increased drag and reduced power at between 1,000 and 500 feet per minute. It was necessary to dump fuel to remain aloft. The crew calculated the added drag left them with insufficient fuel to reach San Francisco or to return to Honolulu. Captain Ogg radioed a message: "PanAm 90943, Flight 6, declaring an emergency over the Pacific". Captain Ogg elected to remain aloft until dawn to increase the chances of ditching successfully.

Captain Ogg had decided to wait for daylight, since it was important to keep the wings level with the ocean swells at the ditching impact. That would be easier to achieve in full sunlight, improving the odds that passengers could be rescued, but he became concerned that the ocean waves were beginning to rise. At that altitude several practice approaches were made to see that the plane would be controllable at low speed (the goal was to have the lowest speed possible, just before touching the water). Delaying the ditching also ensured that more fuel would be consumed, making the plane lighter so it would float longer and minimizing the risk of fire in the event of a crash landing. Captain Ogg informed the passengers of his plans and developments in what he described as a "chatting" manner. He as well as the rest of the cockpit crew visited the passenger cabin to set the passengers at ease.

Aware of the Pan Am Flight 845/26 accident the year before, in which a Boeing 377's tail section had broken off during a water landing, the captain told the flight's purser to clear passengers from the back of the plane. The crew removed loose objects from the cabin, and prepared the passengers for the landing.  As on other flights of the era, small children were allowed on their parents' laps, without separate seats or seat belts.

At 5:40 a.m. Captain Ogg notified Pontchartrain that he was preparing to ditch. The cutter laid out a foam path for a best ditch heading of 315 degrees, to aid the captain to judge his height above the water. All 31 on board survived the ditching. Three life rafts were deployed by the crew and passengers who had been assigned to help. One raft failed to inflate properly, but rescue boats from the cutter were able promptly to transfer the passengers from that raft. All were rescued by the Coast Guard before the last pieces of wreckage sank at 6:35 a.m. Crew on the cutter filmed the landing and the rescue. A ten-minute film was later produced, including a re-enacted recording of the radio conversation between the pilot and the Coast Guard.

The passengers were housed in the ship's officers' quarters and returned to San Francisco several days later. There were a few minor injuries, including an 18-month-old girl who bumped her head during the impact and was knocked unconscious.  Forty-four cases of live canaries in the cargo hold were lost when the plane sank.

Some time later, the crew received awards for their work on the flight, having prevented any fatalities. Pilot Richard Ogg was the first recipient of the Civilian Airmanship Awards presented by the Order of Daedalians.

Probable cause
An investigation report summarized the incident: "An initial mechanical failure which precluded feathering the No. 1 propeller and a subsequent mechanical failure which resulted in a complete loss of power from the no. 4 engine, the effects of which necessitated a ditching."

Flight crew
 Captain Richard N. Ogg, age 43
 First Officer George L. Haaker, age 40
 Navigator Richard L. Brown, age 31
 Flight Engineer Frank Garcia Jr., age 30

Books and periodicals
 [Describes the ditching of Sovereign of the Skies and the rescue of its passengers and crew by the crew of USCGC Pontchartrain.]

Dramatization 
It is featured in season 1, episode 1, of the TV show Why Planes Crash.

See also 
 1963 Aeroflot Tupolev Tu-124 Neva river ditching
 List of accidents and incidents involving commercial aircraft
 US Airways Flight 1549
 Pan Am Flight 7

References

External links
 Accident Investigation Report File No. 1-0121 - Civil Aeronautics Board - PDF
 Aviation Safety Network Description of the accident
 CAB Accident Report - Civil Aeronautics Board
 "HEROES: The Ditching". TIME. Monday, October 29, 1956.
 United States Coast Guard Video "Ready on Ocean Station November"
 Stannard, Matthew B. "Danville Pilot Has Historical Predecessor". San Francisco Chronicle. Saturday, January 24, 2009.
 
 Footage appears in the film Encounters with Disaster, released in 1979 and produced by Sun Classic Pictures. Viewable on the Internet Archive.

6
Aviation accidents and incidents in 1956
Airliner accidents and incidents caused by mechanical failure
Airliner accidents and incidents in Hawaii
Disasters in Hawaii
Airliner accidents and incidents involving ditching
Accidents and incidents involving the Boeing 377
1956 in Hawaii
October 1956 events